Persia is the fourth extended play by the Australian psychedelic rock band the Church, which was released in August 1984. It was the follow-up to their earlier 1984 EP Remote Luxury, and continued in a similar stylistic vein.

The material from both five-track EPs was collected for international release on a compilation album, also called Remote Luxury, later in 1984. In 2001, EMI Australia released another compilation album, Sing-Songs//Remote Luxury//Persia (see also, Sing-Songs), which had remastered versions of all tracks from each of the three EPs, in their original running order.

Background 
The Church released two extended plays in 1984, Remote Luxury in March and Persia in August, but only in Australia and New Zealand. Both EPs reached the Top 50 on the Kent Music Report Albums Chart. Most of the tracks on Persia were written by lead vocalist Steve Kilbey. Compared to their third studio album, Seance, the atmosphere was lighter and less gloomy. The band's trademark guitar sound was complemented by the keyboards of Craig Hooper (from the Reels), who joined as an auxiliary touring member.

Reception 

Evan Cater of AllMusic observed that "it manages to draw from the best qualities of neo-psycheldelia and pop-rock without succumbing to the genres' respective pitfalls. It is atmospheric without being spacey or formless, catchy without being superficial, and mellow without being lethargic". Australian musicologist Ian McFarlane deemed it "excellent", noting that it "yielded such radiant Church moments as 'Constant in Opal' and 'Shadow Cabinet'".

Track listing

 "Constant in Opal" (Steve Kilbey) – 3:28
 "Volumes" (Marty Willson-Piper) – 4:02
 "No Explanation" (Kilbey) – 3:52
 "Violet Town" (Kilbey) – 3:28
 "Shadow Cabinet" (Kilbey, Peter Koppes, Richard Ploog, Willson-Piper) – 4:18

Personnel

The Church
 Steve Kilbey: lead vocals, bass guitar, keyboards
 Peter Koppes: guitars, backing vocals
 Marty Willson-Piper: guitars, backing vocals, lead vocal on "Volumes"
 Richard Ploog: drums, percussion

Additional musicians
 Craig Hooper: keyboards
 Leon Zervos: sound effects

Production work
 Engineer: John Bee
 Mastering: Don Bartley at EMI Studios 301, Sydney
 Mixer: The Church, John Bee at EMI Studios 301, Sydney
 Producer: The Church, John Bee, recorded at EMI Studios 301, Sydney in June–August 1984

References 

1984 EPs
The Church (band) albums